Glenea tritoleuca is a species of beetle in the family Cerambycidae. It was described by Per Olof Christopher Aurivillius in 1924.

Subspecies
 Glenea tritoleuca tritoleuca Aurivillius, 1924
 Glenea tritoleuca uniluteofasciata Pic, 1943

References

tritoleuca
Beetles described in 1924